The individual sprint is a track cycling event held at the Summer Olympics. The event was first held for men at the first modern Olympics in 1896. It was held again in 1900, but not in 1904 when various races at different distances were conducted. The men's sprint returned to the programme in 1908 but was again omitted in 1912, when only road cycling competitions were held. After World War I, the men's sprint returned to the programme for good in 1920 and has been held every Games since. The women's sprint was added when women's track cycling was first held in 1988 and has been held every Games since.

Medalists

Men

Multiple medalists

Medalists by country

Women

Multiple medalists

Medalists by country

Intercalated Games

The 1906 Intercalated Games were held in Athens and at the time were officially recognised as part of the Olympic Games series, with the intention being to hold a games in Greece in two-year intervals between the internationally held Olympics. However, this plan never came to fruition and the International Olympic Committee (IOC) later decided not to recognise these games as part of the official Olympic series. Some sports historians continue to treat the results of these games as part of the Olympic canon.

Francesco Verri of Italy won the 1906 title, with Bert Bouffler of Great Britain in second and Eugène Debongnie of Belgium third.

References

Individual sprint